The infinitesimal model, also known as the polygenic model, is a widely used statistical model in quantitative genetics. Originally developed in 1918 by Ronald Fisher, it is based on the idea that variation in a quantitative trait is influenced by an infinitely large number of genes, each of which makes an infinitely small (infinitesimal) contribution to the phenotype, as well as by environmental factors. In "The Correlation between Relatives on the Supposition of Mendelian Inheritance", the original 1918 paper introducing the model, Fisher showed that if a trait is polygenic, "then the random sampling of alleles at each gene produces a continuous, normally distributed phenotype in the population". However, the model does not necessarily imply that the trait must be normally distributed, only that its genetic component will be so around the average of that of the individual's parents. The model served to reconcile Mendelian genetics with the continuous distribution of quantitative traits documented by Francis Galton. 

The model allows genetic variance to be assumed to remain constant even when natural selection is occurring, because each locus makes an infinitesimal contribution to the variance. Consequently, all decline in genetic variance is assumed to be due to genetic drift. It also relies on the assumption of normal distributions, an assumption which breaks down if a trait is influenced by a finite number of loci. According to one research group, the model "...is obviously not an exact representation of the genome of any species, but is a useful assumption to make in genetic evaluation." Similarly, the model's assumption of infinitely many genes each with an infinitely small effect on the phenotype has been described as "practical but biologically unrealistic", and the genetic basis of evolutionary adaptation, contrary to the prediction of the model, often involves a modest number of loci of large effect.

References

Statistical models
Statistical genetics